The anandalahari is an Indian chordophone musical instrument. The instrument often accompanies dance, and may act as melody and rhythm.

Name
The name anandalahari means "waves of joy". Popularly this instrument is called by onomatopoeic names like gubgubi and khamak.

Description
The anandalahari has a barrel-shaped body, open on one side, and fixed on the "bottom" of a single string. The tool body is wooden, open on both sides; the membrane is fixed in the lower and upper parts with a leather hoop and cords. Some instruments have a hole in the upper diaphragm, others not; it may be completely absent in old instruments. The vein string is attached to the bottom with a piece of bamboo or other material. The other end of the string is fixed inside a copper pot.

Use
The barrel is placed in the left armpit, the pot is taken in the left hand and the string is pulled with it, and the string is played with the right hand using a plectrum.

A similar instrument named pulluvan kudam is found in South India. Another similar instrument known as the gopiyantra kendra is used by the Munda people of Bengal and Odisha. Both the gopiyantra and the anandalahari are used by religious mendicant singers of the Sadhu type and especially by singers of the heterodox Baul faith.

Classification
Curt Sachs believed that the anandalahari and related instruments are a separate class of purely Indian plucked membranophones but ethnomusicologist, Laurence Picken and others have shown that they are clean chordophones.

See also
 Ektara
 Kendara

References

External links
 Anandalahari Banglapedia

Indian musical instruments
Bangladeshi musical instruments
Chordophones
Membranophones
Plucked membranophones